Jeromus Johnson (November 2, 1775 in Wallabout, Kings County, New York – September 7, 1846 in Goshen, Orange County, New York) was an American merchant and politician from New York. From 1825 to 1829, he served two terms in the  U.S. House of Representatives.

Life
He was the son of Maj. Barent Johnson (1740–1782) and Anne (Remsen) Johnson. He attended the public schools, removed to New York City, and engaged in mercantile pursuits. In 1802, he married Mary Carpenter (1782–1863). He was a member of the New York State Assembly in 1822.

Congress 
Johnson was elected as a Jacksonian to the 19th and 20th United States Congresses, holding office from March 4, 1825, to March 3, 1829. He was Chairman of the Committee on Public Expenditures (20th Congress).

Later career and death 
On May 26, 1830, he was appointed an Appraiser of Merchandise for the Port of New York and served until 1840 when he retired from active business and removed to Goshen, the hometown of his wife.

He was buried at a private cemetery on his estate in Goshen.

Family 
Mayor of Brooklyn, Jeremiah Johnson (1766–1852), was his brother.

Sources

The New York Civil List compiled by Franklin Benjamin Hough (pages 71f, 198 and 284; Weed, Parsons and Co., 1858)
The Lifes and Opinions of Benjamin Franklin Butler and Jesse Hoyt by William Lyon Mackenzie (1845; pages 80ff)

1775 births
1846 deaths
Politicians from New York City
People from Goshen, New York
Members of the New York State Assembly
Jacksonian members of the United States House of Representatives from New York (state)
19th-century American politicians
Businesspeople from New York City
Members of the United States House of Representatives from New York (state)